William Ernest Brymer (1840 – 9 May 1909) was a  Conservative politician who sat in the House of Commons in two stages between 1874 and 1906.

Brymer was born at Fordingbridge, Hampshire the son of John Brymer of Burgate House, Fordingbridge, and his wife Eliza Mary Tugwell, only daughter of George Tugwell of Crowe Hall, near Bath. He was educated at Harrow School and at Trinity College, Cambridge. He was a J.P. for Dorset, and a captain in the Dorset Yeomanry Cavalry. He was patron of the rectories of Charlton Mackrell, Somerset, and Child Okeford, Dorset, and the vicarage of Puddletown, Dorset. He was a prominent Freemason, being a Deputy Provincial Grand Master, Grand Superintendent of the Province and Provincial Grand Mark Mason.

In the 1874 general election Brymer was elected Member of Parliament for Dorchester and held the seat until it was replaced under the Redistribution of Seats Act 1885. He was High Sheriff of Dorset in 1887. In 1891, Brymer was elected Member of Parliament for South Dorset and held the seat until 1906.

Brymer lived at Ilsington House in Puddletown. He died at Jerez, Spain, at the age of 69, he had gone to Spain to recuperate after having health problems but died of bronchitis with complications.

References

External links 
 

1840 births
1909 deaths
People educated at Harrow School
Alumni of Trinity College, Cambridge
Conservative Party (UK) MPs for English constituencies
UK MPs 1874–1880
UK MPs 1880–1885
UK MPs 1886–1892
UK MPs 1892–1895
UK MPs 1895–1900
UK MPs 1900–1906
Queen's Own Dorset Yeomanry officers
High Sheriffs of Dorset
Freemasons of the United Grand Lodge of England
People from Fordingbridge